Nosów-Kolonia  is a village in the administrative district of Gmina Leśna Podlaska, within Biała Podlaska County, Lublin Voivodeship, in eastern Poland.

References

Villages in Biała Podlaska County